Pranked is an American comedy television series on MTV. The series debuted on August 27, 2009 and is hosted by CollegeHumor's Amir Blumenfeld and Streeter Seidell.

Premise
The series is a half-an-hour comedy show that provides footage and commentary for pranks that have been caught on camera and posted to the internet.

Cast
 Amir Blumenfeld: Blumenfeld is the senior writer for CollegeHumor.com. He also stars in web series, "Jake and Amir" and "Hardly Working".
 Streeter Seidell: Seidell is the executive editor of CollegeHumor.com and also for the series Streeter Theeter.

Episodes

Season 1 (2009)

Season 2 (2010)

Season 3 (2010)

Season 4 (2012)

Season 5 (2012)

References

External links
 
 

2000s American sketch comedy television series
2010s American sketch comedy television series
2009 American television series debuts
2012 American television series endings
English-language television shows
MTV original programming
CollegeHumor
Television series based on Internet-based works